Temur Ildarovich Mustafin (born 15 April 1995) is a Russian football player who plays for Kyrgyz club Abdysh-Ata Kant.

Club career
Mustafin made his professional debut in the Russian Professional Football League for FC Avangard Kursk on 4 September 2014 in a game against FC Kaluga.

Mustafin made his Russian Football National League debut for FC Zenit-2 Saint Petersburg on 11 July 2016 in a game against FC Sokol Saratov.

Mustafin took 2nd place in the 2018–19 FNL championship as a member of PFC Sochi.

On 18 July 2022, Shakhter Karagandy announced the signing of Mustafin.

On 30 January 2023, Abdysh-Ata Kant announced the signing of Mustafin.

References

External links
 

1995 births
Sportspeople from Tashkent
Living people
Russian people of Uzbek descent
Russian footballers
Russia youth international footballers
Association football defenders
FC Lokomotiv Moscow players
FC Fakel Voronezh players
FC Rostov players
FC Zenit-2 Saint Petersburg players
FC Armavir players
PFC Sochi players
FC Avangard Kursk players
FC Chernomorets Novorossiysk players
Russian First League players
Russian Second League players
Armenian Premier League players
Russian expatriate footballers
Expatriate footballers in Armenia
Russian expatriate sportspeople in Armenia